Neodactria is a genus of moths of the family Crambidae.

Species
Neodactria caliginosellus (Clemens, 1860)
Neodactria cochisensis Landry & Albu, 2012
Neodactria daemonis Landry & Klots in Landry & Brown, 2005
Neodactria glenni Landry & Klots in Landry & Metzler, 2002
Neodactria luteolellus (Clemens, 1860)
Neodactria modestellus (Barnes & McDunnough, 1918)
Neodactria murellus (Dyar, 1904)
Neodactria oktibbeha Landry & Brown, 2005
Neodactria zeellus (Fernald, 1885)

References

Natural History Museum Lepidoptera genus database

Crambini
Crambidae genera